Alexander Scheelen (born 25 June 1987) is a German footballer who plays as a central midfielder for Rot-Weiß Oberhausen.

References

External links

1987 births
Living people
German footballers
Association football midfielders
VfB Speldorf players
Rot-Weiß Oberhausen players
3. Liga players
Regionalliga players
Footballers from Duisburg